"Falling On" is a song by Canadian alternative rock band Finger Eleven. It was released in June 2007 as the second single from album, Them vs. You vs. Me. .

Video
The band premiered the video on July 3, 2007, on an episode of MuchOnDemand. The video for "Falling On" starts off with the band playing in a digital-like white world made out of different dots. When the band nears the end of the first chorus, the dots fall and come back up. At the end of the video, the dots get sucked away and the band is left in the white world. The video reached number-one on the Much Music Countdown.

Charts

References

External links
"Falling On" music video

2007 singles
2007 songs
Finger Eleven songs
Wind-up Records singles
Song recordings produced by Johnny K